Rindon Johnson (born 1990, California) is an American artist and writer. Johnson has exhibited and performed widely at exhibitions in New York, Berlin, Los Angeles, San Francisco, and Seattle. Johnson's multidisciplinary art practice blurs the line between photography, sculpture, and performance using various materials such as leather, light, Vaseline, video, photography and wood to explore aspects of lived space, memory, and history. Johnson is a published author and co-runs the online poetry website, Imperial Matters, with Sophia Le Fraga. Johnson lives and works in Brooklyn, New York and Berlin, Germany.

Early life and education 
Johnson was born in San Francisco, California in 1990. Johnson graduated from New York University and received their MFA from Bard College in 2018.

Work 
Johnson is the author of several books including the chapbook, No One Sleeps Better Than White People, published by Inpatient Press and the virtual reality e-book, Meet Me in the Corner. In 2017, Johnson collaborated with multidisciplinary artist Ser Serpas on Shade the King, a book of stream-of-consciousness-inspired poems by Johnson and abstract drawings by Serpas.

Johnson has written for a number of online and print art publications such as The Brooklyn Rail, Cultured Magazine, Hyperallergic, and Artforum and has taught several courses at Bruce High Quality Foundation University.

Exhibitions 
Solo exhibitions
 Well, Covered, AALA Gallery, Los Angeles, CA 2018 (forthcoming)
 A Din, A Hand, Beacon Sacramento, Sacramento, CA, 2017
 Existential Hangover, The Guest Room IRL at The Museum of Human Achievement, Austin, TX, 2017
Two-person exhibitions
 NADA Presents with Ser Serpas. NADA New York, Ny. 2017
 Astral Oil, Global Family with Jonathan Durham curated by Sorry Archive, The Java Project, Brooklyn, NY, 2017
Selected group exhibitions
 Liquid Love, Gas, Los Angeles, CA, (forthcoming) 2018
 DiMODA, Digital Museum of Digital Art, siggraphasia, Bangkok, Thailand, 2017
 Hypomnemata, INCA, Seattle, WA, 2017
 New Black Portraitures, curated by Aria Dean, Rhizome, Online, 2017 
 NGV Triennial, National Gallery of Victoria, Melbourne, Australia, 2017 
 Somethings Come Between Us, Songs for Presidents, Brooklyn, NY, 2017
 Discursive Selves, Westbeth Gallery, New York, NY, 2017
 Montez Summer, Mathew, New York, NY, 2017
 *the new liquid model*, Duve, Berlin, Germany, 2017
 The Double, Double Show, AALA Gallery, Los Angeles, CA, 2017 
 Night Sweats, Quinn Harrelson/Current Projects, Miami, FL, 2017
 March Madness, Fort Gansevoort, New York City, NY 2017
 Queer Sounding Exhibition, Duke University, Durham, NC, 2017
 About Face, Borscht, Miami, FL, 2017
 ECOCORE 5, 80 WSE Gallery, New York University, New York, NY, 2017
 The Unframed World, HeK (Haus der elektronischen Künste), Basel, Switzerland, 2017
 Destroy and Conquer, Disclaimer Gallery, Satellite Art Fair, Miami, FL, 2016
 BODY TECHNIQUE, Human Resources, Los Angeles, CA, 2016
 Queering Space, Green Gallery, Yale University School of Art, New Haven, CT, 2016 
 Rubbings, Zax, Brooklyn, NY, 2016
 Re: Art Show, Pfizer Building, Brooklyn, NY, 2016
 The Printed Room: Works off Paper, Mixtape, S.A.L.T.S., Basel, Switzerland, 2016
 Celebrate Summer, Jenkins Johnson Gallery, San Francisco, CA, 2016
 Young, Colored and Angry, Holyrad Studios, Brooklyn, NY, 2015
 By Invitation Only Exhibition, Kinz + Tillou Fine Art, Brooklyn, NY, 2014
 The Last Brucennial, Bruce High Quality Foundation, New York, NY, 2014
 Coast2Coast Exhibition, Almost Holden Collective, Santa Monica, CA, 2013
 CAW Juried Show, curated by Robert Storr, Creative Arts Workshop, New Haven, CT, 2013
 Into the Monochrome – No Empty Square, Peninsula Art Space & Brooklyn Fire Proof, Bushwick & Red Hook Brooklyn, NY, 2013

References

1990 births
Living people
New York University alumni
Bard College alumni
People from San Francisco
American artists
American writers